Vladimir Sergeyevich Shitov (8 July 1952 – 8 November 2011) was a Soviet luger who competed during the late 1970s. He won the silver medal at the men's doubles event at the 1978 FIL World Luge Championships in Imst, Austria.

Shitov also won a bronze medal in the men's singles event at the 1978 FIL European Luge Championships in Hammarstrand, Sweden.

References
Hickok sports information on World champions in luge and skeleton.
List of European luge champions 
Vladimir Zhitov's obituary 
Vladimir Shitov. sports-reference.com

1952 births
2011 deaths
Olympic lugers of the Soviet Union
Soviet male lugers
Lugers at the 1976 Winter Olympics